is a Japanese former volleyball player who competed in the 1984 Summer Olympics and in the 1988 Summer Olympics.

References

1957 births
Living people
Japanese men's volleyball players
Olympic volleyball players of Japan
Volleyball players at the 1984 Summer Olympics
Volleyball players at the 1988 Summer Olympics
Asian Games medalists in volleyball
Volleyball players at the 1982 Asian Games
Medalists at the 1982 Asian Games
Asian Games gold medalists for Japan